Iran competed at the Winter Olympic Games for the first time at the 1956 Winter Olympics in Cortina d'Ampezzo, Italy. Three athletes and four officials represented Iran in the 1956 Olympics.

Competitors

Results by event

Skiing

Alpine

Men

References

External links
Official Olympic Reports

1956
Nations at the 1956 Winter Olympics
Winter Olympics
Pahlavi Iran